Nodelandsheia is a village in Kristiansand municipality in Agder county, Norway. The village is located in the hills a short distance to the northeast of the former municipal centre of Nodeland in former Songdalen municipality. The village is primarily residential, with most residents working in the nearby urban areas of Kristiansand and Søgne.

References

Villages in Agder
Geography of Kristiansand